is a town consisting of the entirety of Mishima District, Osaka Prefecture, Japan.
It is located in Prefectural border with Kyoto Otokuni-gun Oyamazaki-cho. At the place where Katsura River, Uji River, Kizu River merge in the Yamazaki Gorge and become Yodo River It has prospered for a long time as a key point of transportation from Kyoto Basin to Osaka Plain. Recently, residential area development is progressing as Bedtown of Osaka City and Kyoto City.

History
The town is named after the Shimamoto clan of the feudal era, who were famous for their skill in warfare, excellence in the arts, and intelligence. They still exist to this day.
Shimamoto Town is sandwiched between Tennozan and Otokoyama, and is the only transportation hub that does not require crossing the mountain on the road connecting Settsu and Yamashiro. Since ancient times, the Sanyo Expressway that connects the imperial court and Dazaifu has been used, and it has prospered in that environment.

The area where the Minase and Yodo rivers meet (currently the Hirose and Todaiji districts) is called Minase. Known for its scenery and fluttering haze, it has been used as a Utamakura since the time of "Manyoshu". Emperor Go-Toba loved this place and built Minamise Rikyu. After the death of the emeritus, the site of the Rikyuin became Minase Shrine (currently Minamise Jingu), which is the emeritus's Mikagedo. In addition, if you arrange 50 phrases from Ogura Hyakunin Isshu in the order of the words, the picture of Minase will be completed. It is said that this is because Fujiwara no Teika has collected songs that match the drawings. In addition, Shin Kokin Wakashū Vol.

In addition, Sakurai District is a part of Sakurai's Farewell, where Minatogawa Battle Masashige Kusunoki broke up with Takako Masayuki Kusunoki. Appears in Taiheiki as the ground. The current Shimamoto Town Akira is a transformation of the characters "Shimamoto" to resemble Kusunoki's family crest Kikusui.

In addition, it is also known as the old battlefield of Battle of Yamazaki where Toyotomi Hideyoshi (Hashiba Hideyoshi) and Akechi Mitsuhide fought.

 1889 (Meiji 22) April 1 Machimura system With the enforcement of Shimakami-gun Sakurai Village, Takahama Village, Hirose Village, Todaiji Village, Yamazaki Village, Shakudai Village, and Osawa Village merged to form Shimamoto Village, Shimakami District.
 1896 (Meiji 29) April 1 Mishima-gun was established.
 1940 (Showa 15) April 1 town system was enforced and became Shimamoto-cho, Mishima-gun, and continues to the present day.

Administration 
 Mayor: Kohei Yamada (2017 April 21 Inauguration, 2nd term)

Congress

Town council 
 Constant: 14 people
 Chair: Masaki Higashida (Community Net)
 Vice-chairman: Takayuki Okubo (Osaka Restoration Association)
 Audit Committee member: Sadaharu Shimizu (Liberal Democratic Club)
The parliamentary group composition as of May 13, 2021, with 50% female members, is as follows:

Osaka Prefectural Assembly 
 Constituency: Takatsuki City / Mishima District Constituency
 Constant: 4 people
 Term: April 30, 2019 – April 29, 2023
 Voting date: April 7, 2019
 Number of voters on the day: 318,177
 Voter turnout: 52.93%

House of Representatives 
 Osaka 10th District (Takatsuki City,  Mishima District)
 Term: October 31, 2021 – October 30, 2025
 Voting date: October 31, 2021
 Number of voters on the day: 320,990
 Voter turnout: 63.32%

Economy

Industry

A company with a business office in Shimamoto Town 
 Suntory Yamazaki Distillery
 Hitachi Metal Yamazaki Manufacturing Department
 Toppan Forms Osaka Sakurai Factory
 Ono Pharmaceutical Minase Research Institute
 Sekisui Chemical Development Laboratory

Financial institution 
 Resona Bank Shimamoto Branch (Egawa 2-chome)
 Bank of Kyoto Yamazaki Branch (Minamise 1-chome)
 Kita Osaka Shinkin Bank Shimamoto Branch (Minase 2-chome)

Japan Post Group 
(As of December 2012)
 Japan Post Co., Ltd.
 Shimamoto Minase Post Office (Takahama)
 Shimamoto Todaiji Post Office (Todaiji)

Geography 
It occupies most of the basin of Minase River, a tributary of the Yodo River. The town area is long from northwest to southeast, and the altitude increases as it goes northwest. Nearly 70% of the entire town is mountainous and hilly. An urban area is open in a small open lowland along the Yodo River in the southeast, but this area is the main traffic connecting First National Land Axis Tokaido Shinkansen / Tokaido Main Line.  And Meishin Expressway, as well as major traffic such as Hankyu Kyoto Main Line and National Highway 171. There is a point where the Katsura, Uji, and Kizu rivers meet, and because the water temperature of each river is different, a lot of fog is generated in winter.

At sea level, Shakadake is the highest at 631.4 m, and the lowest is Takahama at 8.5 m.

Economy
Shimamoto is the location of Suntory's Yamazaki Distillery, the oldest whiskey distillery in Japan.

Transport
The town is served by two railway stations: Shimamoto and Minase.

Twin towns
 Frankfort (Kentucky, United States)

External links

 Shimamoto official website 
 Sister cities page on Shimamoto/Frankfort

Towns in Osaka Prefecture